Dayton National Cemetery is a United States National Cemetery located in the city of Dayton in Montgomery County, Ohio. It encompasses  and as of July 18, 2019, had 55,359 interments. In January, 2014, it was one of only fourteen cemeteries to be designated as a national shrine. A new 2,000 niche columbarium was dedicated on July 24, 2014. It is one of a few National Cemeteries with their own Honor Squad. Since its formation, unless refused by family and during a few weeks the National Cemetery Administration disallowed military honors in their cemeteries, no veteran has been buried without a Rifle Salute in addition to "Taps" and the folding and presentation of the Flag. It is also the only National Cemetery with the remains of a funeral tunnel which once allowed deceased veterans to be removed from the Home Hospital to the cemetery. Plans are in process to restore the entrance into the tunnel to its original form.

History 
The cemetery was established in 1867 as a place to inter veterans who died while under the care of the Central Branch of the National Asylum for Disabled Volunteer Soldiers and Seamen, located in Dayton. It was the third such home authorized by Abraham Lincoln, March 3, 1865, just before his death. The first interment, of Civil War veteran Cornelius Solly, was on September 11, 1867. The National Asylum became part of the newly formed Department of Veterans Affairs in 1930 and evolved into today's Dayton VA Medical Center. The cemetery was administered as part of the medical center until 1973, when it was transferred to the National Cemetery Administration.

Dayton National Cemetery is one of eight National Cemeteries with the remains of veterans from every major conflict the United States has been involved in dating back to the American Revolutionary War. 650 Colored Troops are interred at Dayton National Cemetery, one of the largest collection of Colored Troops' graves which links the cemetery even further with Lincoln since he authorized the creation of Colored Troops units.

Noteworthy monuments 
 The Dayton Soldiers' Monument was constructed between 1873 and 1877. It is a  marble column on a granite base. Dedicated by President Rutherford B. Hayes.
 A memorial to 33 soldiers of the War of 1812 buried in this cemetery. A bronze plaque on a boulder.
 A memorial to all Masonic Veterans was erected in 2018. Dedicated by Eric R. Schau, Grand Master and the Grand Lodge of Ohio.

Notable interments 
 Medal of Honor recipients
 Henry W. Downs (1844–1911), for action in the American Civil War
 Oscar Wadsworth Field (1873–1912), for action in the Spanish–American War
 George Geiger (1843–1904), for action at the Battle of Little Bighorn during the Indian Wars
 John H. James (1835–1914), for action in the Civil War
 Charles A. Taggart (1843–1938), for action in the Civil War
 Others
 Big Joe Duskin (1921–2007), American blues and boogie-woogie pianist
 Joe Henderson (1937–2001), jazz saxophonist
 Tommy Henrich (1913–2009), Major League Baseball player
 James Hobbs (1819-1880), Scout for the Texas Rangers, author of Wild Life in the Far West (1872)
 Stubby Magner (1888–1956), Major League Baseball player
 Christian Null (1770–1832), Revolutionary War Soldier
 Marsena R. Patrick (1811–1888), U.S. Army general
 Johnnie Wilder Jr. (1949–2006), R&B/funk vocalist
 Paul P. Yoder (1897–1965), Ohio Lieutenant Governor (1937–1939)

Other interments
 One British Commonwealth war grave, of a Canadian Army Corporal (died 1947)

References

External links 
 A Nation Repays Its Debt:The National Soldiers' Home and Cemetery in Dayton, Ohio, a National Park Service Teaching with Historic Places (TwHP) lesson plan
 
 
 
 CWGC: Dayton National Cemetery

Cemeteries in Montgomery County, Ohio
Protected areas of Montgomery County, Ohio
United States national cemeteries
Tourist attractions in Dayton, Ohio
Geography of Dayton, Ohio
Historic American Landscapes Survey in Ohio
Cemeteries in Dayton, Ohio
Commonwealth War Graves Commission cemeteries in the United States